Sharwood's is a British food company, which specialises in Asian food, established in 1889 and acquired by RHM in 1963, which was then merged into Premier Foods in March 2007.

Company products 
The company produces Indian, Chinese and South East Asian food products and ingredients. It produces many cooking sauces, which usually come in a recognisable square shape jar, and also curry pastes and powders, pappadoms, naan breads, noodles, prawn crackers as well as ready meals. It holds the largest market share in Britain in this range. As of 2007 it claims to have 28% of the Asian food market in Britain, and that 46% of sales are from sauces. The sauces are made at the Worksop Factory in north Nottinghamshire.

Media 
In August 2010 Sharwood's teamed up with actor and personality Joanna Lumley to develop a limited edition Mango Chutney with Kashmiri Chilli – an ingredient from her birthplace. Sharwood's pledged to donate 10p from each jar sold to the Gurkha Welfare Trust.

In 2012, Sharwood's released an extended range to complement its tikka masala sauce; these are "Extra Mild", "Extra Creamy", "Extra Onions" and "Mango Chutney flavour".

In addition to the UK, Sharwood's products are available in Australia, New Zealand, and North America.

External links 
Sharwood's Website
Premier Foods The owner of Sharwood's.

References

Premier Foods brands
Food manufacturers of the United Kingdom